Mikhail Viktorovich Mitrofanov (Михаил Викторович Митрофанов), (born in Kazan, circa 1977) is a Russian rugby league footballer, ice hockey player. He is a Master of Sports of Russia of international class in rugby.

Career
As a child he played ice hockey, later switched to rugby union. Known for his performances for Strela Kazan [4]. Five-times champion of Russia, runner-up at the European Rugby League among students as part of the national team of Tatarstan (2001), three times participant in international tournaments within the Rugby League World Cup.
In 2000 he played for the Russian national rugby league team at the World Cup in England, having played three matches. In the match against Fiji, he scored a try, and in the match against England he scored two penalties. In 2001, at the European Championship among students, he became the top scorer in the Tatarstan team, which lost to England 34-16 in the final, and in the final in the first half the team started a massive fight with the British. In 2011, he played for the Russian national beach rugby team. Currently, he plays for the senior rugby team "Sedye Barsy" and the ice hockey team Torpedo from Kazan in the Night Hockey League.

References

Living people
Russian rugby league players
Russia national rugby league team players
Sportspeople from Kazan
Rugby league fullbacks
Rugby league wingers
1977 births